Sony Entertainment Television (SET) is an Indian Hindi-language general entertainment pay television channel, that was launched on 30 September 1995, and is owned by Culver Max Entertainment, a subsidiary of the Japanese Sony.

SET India's YouTube channel has over 133 billion total views, making it the third most-viewed YouTube channel overall; and over 146 million subscribers, making it the third most-subscribed YouTube channel as of November 2022.

History
This channel was launched in September 1995 which started airing many dramatic and reality shows. It also started airing all Disney Channel shows and Disney movies until 2003 and it also aired CID and Crime Patrol. In 2006, Sony made an adaptation of the famous show Big Brother, Bigg Boss. It also made an adaptation of American show Fear Factor, Fear Factor India but all these shows were moved to Colors TV.

In 2001, it changed its logo to a green colour. In 2016, it changed its logo to a purple colour. In 2022, it changed its logo to match that of SonyLIV

Programming

Availability

Outside India

A version for international transmission exists, which was previously known as Sony Entertainment Television Asia. Launched on 8 October 1998, it is based in the United Kingdom. The network has a great following amongst the South Asian countries, and some regions have their own programming. The international version is available in several countries and regions.

SonyLIV 

SonyLIV was launched in India in January 2013 and it has access to 18 years of content from channels that comprise part of the Sony Entertainment Network. That translates to more than 700 movies and 40,000+ hours of television show coverage in Hindi, English,Tamil. The streaming service was overhauled and dubbed SonyLIV 2.0 and started rolling out with new user experience and an all-new brand identity.

Logos

References

External links
 

 
Sony Pictures Networks India
Television stations in Mumbai
Hindi-language television channels in India
Sony Pictures Entertainment
Television channels and stations established in 1995
Entertainment-related YouTube channels
1995 establishments in Maharashtra